Elwyn Inc. is a care facility in Elwyn, Pennsylvania, in Middletown Township, Delaware County, Pennsylvania for mentally disabled individuals as well as those with age-related mental disabilities. Established in 1852, it provides education, rehabilitation, employment options, child welfare services, assisted living, respite care, campus and community therapeutic residential programs, and other support for daily living. Elwyn has satellite operations in Pennsylvania, New Jersey and Delaware, as well as programs in California. The first overseas offshoot of Elwyn Inc., Israel Elwyn, was founded in Jerusalem in 1984.

Elwyn Inc., and the community it resides in, are named for its founder, Dr. Alfred L. Elwyn, a physician, author and philanthropist.

History

Dr. Elwyn was one of the  founding officers of the Pennsylvania Institution for the Instruction of the Blind in 1833. He traveled to Boston for a meeting of the American Association for the Advancement of Science in 1849. He had promised  to take a letter from Rachel Laird, a blind girl living in Philadelphia, to Laura Bridgman, who was a famous blind deaf mute in Boston. Bridgman was studying at the South Boston Institute for the Blind, and while there Elwyn visited a classroom for mentally disabled children run by teacher Dr. James B. Richards.

Elwyn was impressed with Richards' work and resolved to do something similar in Pennsylvania. In 1852, with Richards, Elwyn established a training school for mentally disabled people in Germantown, Pennsylvania. In 1853, the Pennsylvania State Legislature formally chartered "The Pennsylvania Training School for Feeble-Minded Children" with Richards as its first superintendent in Germantown. The school soon outgrew its facilities in Germantown, and in 1857 a  farm was purchased in Media, Pennsylvania to house a new facility with help from the Pennsylvania legislature. The buildings were completed in 1859 and Elwyn, Richards, and 25 students moved in on September 1, 1859. The school was officially dedicated November 2, 1859 and industrialist John P. Crozer spoke at the ceremony. Elwyn became head of the school in 1870.

Dr. Isaac N. Kerlin was superintendent of Elwyn in the early 20th century and was a proponent of sterilization procedures on those with intellectual disabilities. 98 sterilization procedures (59 males - 39 females) were conducted at Elwyn over the course of a ten-year period.

Elwyn has over 5,000 employees. In 2018, Elwyn served over 24,000 people with over 1,000 in group homes.

Locations
Elwyn, founded 1852.
Media, Pennsylvania, Main facility, established in 1859.
Philadelphia, established in 1982.
Wilmington, Delaware, established in 1974.
Vineland, New Jersey, Vineland Training School, established 1888, merged with Elwyn in 1988.
Elwyn California, independent affiliate, established in 1974.
Fountain Valley, California
Torrance, California
Israel Elwyn, independent, former affiliate, established in 1984.

See also
Israel Elwyn

References

External links
Elwyn website
Elwyn Historical Archives, The Archives and Library on Disability, University of Colorado
Elwyn records 1852-2006, Philadelphia Area Archives Research Portal (PAARP)
Free Library of Philadelphia - Image of Pennsylvania Training School for Feeble-Minded Children

Educational institutions established in 1852
Eugenics organizations
Special schools in the United States
1852 establishments in Pennsylvania